This article lists all power stations in Syria.

Renewable

Hydroelectric

Non-renewable

Thermal

See also 
 List of largest power stations in the world
 List of power stations in Asia

References 

Syria

Power stations